Scott Lighty (born October 15, 1978) is an American Heavyweight kickboxer and Light Heavyweight mixed martial artist. He currently trains at The Pit alongside UFC veterans, Chuck Liddell and Glover Teixeira. Lighty currently fights for the Strikeforce organization. He also owns a small business, Lighty's Independent Volkswagen Repair.

Kickboxing career

K-1 career
Lighty made his K-1 debut as a tournament reserve fighter on the August 2004 K-1 card in Las Vegas, Nevada, scoring a second-round knockout over Frank Cota. In 2005, he finished as a runner-up at "Mayhem At The Mirage" tournament. He knocked out Tatsufumi Tomihira by a high kick in the quarterfinals and beat Chalid Arrab by a unanimous decision in the semifinals. In the final bout, Lighty remained on his feet, but took a considerable amount of punishment from the Russian kickboxer Ruslan Karaev and lost the fight after three rounds of action.

Mixed martial arts career

Mixed martial arts career
After 2007, there were not many K-1 fights held in the United States and Lighty decided to switch from kickboxing to mixed martial arts. He made his professional debut on the reality show TapouT and won that battle by verbal submission in the first round over Derek Thornton.
In his next fight, Lighty fought Antwain Britt at Strikeforce: Evolution. Lighty lost via TKO (doctor stoppage) after the first round.

Titles
2005 K-1 World Grand Prix in Las Vegas II runner up
2004 Rising Sun Heavyweight Tournament Champion

Kickboxing record

|-
|
|Loss
| Patrick Barry
|Shin Do Kumate XI
|Tampa, Florida, USA
|KO (right high kick)
|align="center"|3
|align="center"|
| 
|-
|
|Loss
| Stefan Leko
|K-1 World Grand Prix 2006 in Las Vegas II
|Las Vegas, Nevada, USA
|TKO (referee stoppage)
|align="center"|3
|align="center"|0:58
|2006 Las Vegas Grand Prix II quarter-final.
|-
|
|Loss
| Gary Goodridge
|K-1 World Grand Prix 2006 in Las Vegas
|Las Vegas, Nevada, USA
|TKO (punch)
|align="center"|1
|align="center"|0:34
|2006 Las Vegas Grand Prix semi-final.
|-
|
|Win
| Dewey Cooper
|K-1 World Grand Prix 2006 in Las Vegas
|Las Vegas, Nevada, USA
|Decision (unanimous)
|align="center"|3
|align="center"|3:00
|2006 Las Vegas Grand Prix quarter-final.
|-
|
|Loss
| Ruslan Karaev
|K-1 World Grand Prix 2005 in Las Vegas II
|Las Vegas, Nevada, USA
|Decision (unanimous)
|align="center"|3
|align="center"|3:00
|2005 Las Vegas Grand Prix II final.
|-
|
|Win
| Chalid Arrab
|K-1 World Grand Prix 2005 in Las Vegas II
|Las Vegas, Nevada, USA
|Decision (unanimous)
|align="center"|3
|align="center"|3:00
|2005 Las Vegas Grand Prix II semi-final.
|-
|
|Win
| Tatsufumi Tomihira
|K-1 World Grand Prix 2005 in Las Vegas II
|Las Vegas, Nevada, USA
|KO (right high kick)
|align="center"|1
|align="center"|1:23
|2005 Las Vegas Grand Prix II quarter-final.
|-
|
|Loss
| Gary Goodridge
|K-1 World Grand Prix 2005 in Las Vegas
|Las Vegas, Nevada, USA
|TKO (low kicks)
|align="center"|1
|align="center"|2:55
|2005 Las Vegas Grand Prix semi-final.
|-
|
|Win
| Patrick Barry
|K-1 World Grand Prix 2005 in Las Vegas
|Las Vegas, Nevada, USA
|Decision (split)
|align="center"|3
|align="center"|3:00
|2005 Las Vegas Grand Prix reserve bout.
|-
|
|Loss
| Mighty Mo
|K-1 World Grand Prix 2004 in Las Vegas II
|Las Vegas, Nevada, USA
|KO (right overhand)
|align="center"|1
|align="center"|1:29
|2004 Las Vegas Grand Prix II semi-final.
|-
|
|Win
| Frank Cota, Jr.
|K-1 World Grand Prix 2004 in Las Vegas II
|Las Vegas, Nevada, USA
|KO
|align="center"|2
|align="center"|1:41
|2004 Las Vegas Grand Prix II reserve bout.
|-
|
|Win
| Sean McCully
|K-1 World Grand Prix 2004 in Las Vegas I
|Las Vegas, Nevada, USA
|TKO
|align="center"|2
|align="center"|2:04
|2004 Las Vegas Grand Prix I reserve bout.
|-
|
|Win
| Aaron Weiss
|ISKA Strikeforce
|San Jose, California, USA
|Decision (unanimous)
|align="center"|3
|align="center"|3:00
| 
|-
|
|Loss
| Carter Williams
| 
|Monterey, California, USA
|KO (high kick)
|align="center"|1
|align="center"|
| 
|-
|-
| colspan=9 | Legend:

Mixed martial arts record

|-
| Loss
| align=center| 6–2
| Lorenz Larkin
| TKO
( punches)
| Strikeforce Challengers: Wilcox vs. Damm
| 
| align=center| 2
| align=center| 3:15
| Stockton, United States
| 
|-
| Win
| align=center| 6–1
| Shawn Frye
| TKO 
( punches)
| Fight for Wrestling 2
| 
| align=center| 2
| align=center| 1:36
| Bakersfield, United States
| 
|-
| Loss
| align=center| 5–1
| Antwain Britt
| TKO (doctor stoppage)
| Strikeforce: Evolution
| 
| align=center| 1
| align=center| 5:00
| San Jose, United States
| 
|-
| Win
| align=center| 5–0
| Mike Cook
| TKO (punch to the body)
| Strikeforce: Carano vs. Cyborg
| 
| align=center| 1
| align=center| 2:05
| San Jose, California|San Jose, United States
| 
|-
| Win
| align=center| 4–0
| Jamiah Williamson
| TKO (punches)
| ShoXC: Elite Challenger Series
| 
| align=center| 1
| align=center| 4:51
| Santa Ynez, United States
| 
|-
| Win
| align=center| 3–0
| Kawika Morton
| Decision (unanimous)
| PureCombat: Hard Core
| 
| align=center| 3
| align=center| 5:00
| Visalia, United States
| 
|-
| Win
| align=center| 2–0
| Paul Mince
| TKO (doctor stoppage)
| PureCombat: Lights Out
| 
| align=center| 1
| align=center| 3:00
| Visalia, United States
| 
|-
| Win
| align=center| 1–0
| Derek Thornton
| Submission (verbal)
| PFC 6: No Retreat, No Surrender
| 
| align=center| 1
| align=center| 2:33
| Lemoore, United States
|

See also 
List of K-1 events
List of male kickboxers
List of male mixed martial artists

References

External links

Profile at K-1

1978 births
Living people
American male kickboxers
Kickboxers from California
Heavyweight kickboxers 
American male mixed martial artists
Mixed martial artists from California
Light heavyweight mixed martial artists
Mixed martial artists utilizing Muay Thai
Mixed martial artists utilizing kajukenbo
American Muay Thai practitioners
American kajukenbo practitioners
People from San Luis Obispo, California